Erik Ivan Bodin (20 July 1923 – 29 August 1991) was a Swedish football defender who represented Sweden at the 1950 FIFA World Cup. He also played for AIK in Allsvenskan for 6 seasons. Besides football Ivan also represented AIK in bandy. He was married to Britt and they had two children, who are named Gunilla and Lars.

References

1923 births
Swedish footballers
Sweden international footballers
Association football defenders
AIK Fotboll players
1950 FIFA World Cup players
1991 deaths
People from Sundsvall
Sportspeople from Västernorrland County